Dieter Ritter (born 26 July 1941) is a German former biathlete. He competed in the 20 km individual event at the 1964 Winter Olympics.

References

External links
 

1941 births
Living people
German male biathletes
Olympic biathletes of the United Team of Germany
Biathletes at the 1964 Winter Olympics
People from Altenberg, Saxony
Sportspeople from Saxony